Sextus (possibly Gaius) Julius Saturninus (died 280 AD) was a Roman usurper against Emperor Probus.

Julius Saturninus was a Gaul by birth (others have him as a Moor) and was a friend of Emperor Probus. He was appointed governor of Syria by Probus (c. 279).

After Probus had left Syria for the Rhine in 280, unruly soldiers and the people of Alexandria forced a reluctant Saturninus to accept imperial office. He fled from Alexandria to escape the pressure but changed his mind in Palestine. He proclaimed himself emperor in 280. Conflictingly, the Historia Augusta states that Probus learned of this and sent men to kill him, while according to an account by Zosimus, before Probus could respond to the threat, Saturninus was dead, killed by his own troops.

Notes

References

280 deaths
3rd-century Roman usurpers
3rd-century Roman governors of Syria
3rd-century Gallo-Roman people
3rd-century murdered monarchs
Crisis of the Third Century
Year of birth unknown
Saturninus, Sextus
Roman governors of Syria
Murdered Roman emperors